"Nuclear" is a song by singer-songwriter Ryan Adams from his 2002 album Demolition, the only single from the album.

The song was recorded during Adams' July 2001 sessions with the Pinkhearts in Nashville.

In 2002, Adams spoke with CNN about the song: "I guess it's Britpop for Americans.  I don't know what it is, really, but the lyrics are funny.  There's actually a really funny line in it that says, 'I saw her and the Yankees lost to the Braves.'  If you're from Atlanta, that's not a very nice thing to say.  It's sort of referring to the fact that the Braves never win." (The Atlanta Braves lost both the 1996 and 1999 World Series to the New York Yankees.)

Among the b-sides included on the various "Nuclear" singles are the non-album tracks "Blue" and "Song For Keith".  Adams co-wrote "Blue" with Julianna Raye, and the song comes from the 48 Hours sessions.  "Song For Keith" is a tribute to Rolling Stones guitarist Keith Richards and was recorded during The Pinkhearts Sessions.

Track listings 
European CD Single (released 16 September 2002)

 "Nuclear" (LP version)
 "Blue" (non-album track)

UK 7" Single (released 16 September 2002)

 "Nuclear" (LP version)
 "Song For Keith" (non-album track)

CD1 Single (released 4 March 2003)

 "Nuclear" (LP version)
 "Blue" (non-album track)
 "Song For Keith" (non-album track)

CD2 Single (released 4 March 2003)

 "Nuclear" (LP version)
 "New York, New York" (Live in Amsterdam)
 "To Be Young (Is To Be Sad, Is To Be High)" (Live in Amsterdam)

Personnel and production credits
 Ryan Adams —  electric guitar, vocals
 Bucky Baxter —  steel guitar
 Billy Mercer —  bass
 Brad Pemberton —  drums
 Brad Rice —  electric guitar
 Produced by Dave Domanich
 Engineered by Warren Peterson and Chad Brown
 Recorded at Javelina Recording Studios (Nashville, Tennessee)

"Blue"
 Ryan Adams —  lead vocal and guitar
 Greg Leisz —  pedal steel
 Chris Stills —  rhythm guitar
 Ethan Johns —  drums
 Julianna Raye —  background vocals
 Produced by Ethan Johns

"Song For Keith"
 Ryan Adams —  lead vocal, guitar and drums
 Billy Mercer —  bass: Billy Mercer
 David Rawlings —  guitar
 Brad Rice —  guitar and background vocals
 Tony Scalzo —  piano
 Produced by Dave Domanich

References

Ryan Adams songs
2002 singles